The 21st annual Berlin International Film Festival was held from 26 June – 6 July 1971. The Young Filmmakers Forum (in 1987 renamed International Forum for New Cinema) section was introduced at the festival. The Golden Bear was awarded to the Italian film Il giardino dei Finzi-Contini directed by Vittorio De Sica.

Jury
The following people were announced as being on the jury for the festival:
 Bjørn Rasmussen writer and film critic (Denmark) - Jury President
 Ida Ehre actress and director of the Hamburg Kammerspiele theatre (West Germany)
 Walter Albuquerque Mello, co-founder of the Festival de Brasília (Brazil)
 Paul Claudon, producer (France)
 Kenneth Harper, producer (United Kingdom)
 Mani Kaul, director (India)
 Charlotte Kerr, actress, director and screenwriter (West Germany)
 Rex Reed, film critic (United States)
 Giancarlo Zagni, director and screenwriter (Italy)

Films in competition
The following films were in competition for the Golden Bear award:

Key
{| class="wikitable" width="550" colspan="1"
| style="background:#FFDEAD;" align="center"| †
|Winner of the main award for best film in its section
|}

Young Filmmakers Forum
 The Murder of Fred Hampton, directed by Howard Alk (USA)
 Bananera libertad, directed by Peter von Gunten (Switzerland)
 La bandera que levantamos, directed by Mario Jacob and Eduardo Terra (Uruguay)
 La Bataille des dix millions, directed by Chris Marker and Valérie Mayoux (France, Cuba)
 儀式 Gishiki, directed by Nagisa Ōshima (Japan)
 Chicago 70, directed by Kerry Feltham (USA, Canada)
 Geschichten vom Kübelkind, directed by Edgar Reitz and Ula Stöckl (West Germany)
 Der große Verhau, directed by Alexander Kluge (West Germany)
 Ich liebe dich, ich töte dich, directed by Uwe Brandner (West Germany)
 James ou pas, directed by Michel Soutter (Switzerland)
 Leave Me Alone, directed by Gerhard Theuring (West Germany)
 La memoria di Kunz, directed by Ivo Barnabò Micheli (Italy)
 Monangambé, directed by Sarah Maldoror (Angola)
 Nicht der Homosexuelle ist pervers, sondern die Situation, in der er lebt, directed by Rosa von Praunheim (West Germany)
 No pincha!, directed by Tobias Engel (Burkina Faso, France)
 Olimpia agli amici, directed by Adriano Aprà (Italy)
 Ossessione, directed by Luchino Visconti (Italy)
 Ostia, directed by Sergio Citti (Italy)
 Remparts d'argile, directed by Jean-Louis Bertuccelli (France, Algeria)
 Αναπαράσταση Anaparastasi, directed by Theo Angelopoulos (Greece)
 La salamandre, directed by Alain Tanner (Switzerland, France)
 Счастье Schastye, directed by Aleksandr Medvedkin (Soviet Union)
 Шестая часть мира Shestaya Chast Mira, directed by Dziga Vertov (Soviet Union)
 Tropici, directed by Gianni Amico (Italy)
 Umano, non umano, directed by Mario Schifano (Italy)
 Voto + fusil, directed by Helvio Soto (Chile)
 وشمة Wechma, directed by Hamid Benani (Morocco)
 The Woman's Film, directed by Louise Alaimo, Judy Smith  and Ellen Sorren (USA)
 WR - Misterije organizma, directed by Dušan Makavejev (Yugoslavia, West Germany)

Awards

The following prizes were awarded by the Jury:
 Golden Bear: Il giardino dei Finzi-Contini by Vittorio De Sica
 Silver Bear for Best Actress: 
 Simone Signoret for Le Chat
 Shirley MacLaine for Desperate Characters
 Silver Bear for Best Actor: Jean Gabin for Le Chat
 Silver Bear for an outstanding single achievement:
 Ragnar Lasse-Henriksen for Love Is War
 Frank D. Gilroy for Desperate Characters
 Silver Bear Extraordinary Jury Prize: Il Decameron by Pier Paolo Pasolini
 Special Recognition: Ang.: Lone by Franz Ernst

References

External links
 Berlin International Film Festival 1971
1971 Berlin International Film Festival
Berlin International Film Festival:1971  at Internet Movie Database

21
1971 film festivals
1971 in West Germany
1970s in West Berlin